Bidkhun-e Morghak (also Romanized as Bīdkhūn-e Morghak; also known as Bīd Khān and Bīd Khūn) is a village in Deh Bakri Rural District, in the Central District of Bam County, Kerman Province, Iran. At the 2006 census, its population was 34, in 12 families.

References 

Populated places in Bam County